Rock In Solo Festival shortly Rock In Solo or RIS is a music festival dedicated to rock, metal and related styles of music held in Surakarta, Indonesia. The history of Rock In Solo began in 2004.  By 2012 the event had become one of the major music festival in Indonesia with 37 bands performing on 3 stages with 8.000 visitors.

The festival was first held in 2004 as a small event for Indonesian bands with one stage and seven bands. The second edition was launched in 2007 and the third in 2009. The 2009 edition is also the first edition to feature international band. Since 2009 the festival had been held annually until 2015. In 2010 Rock In Solo took place with around 20 bands performing on 2 stages. On the 2011 edition, the festival facilitated 33 bands with 4 stages.

The attendance of Rock In Solo has grown and the festival has attracted around 8,000 people in 2012 compared to 1,500 in 2004 on its first incarnation. The 2013 edition was attended by 10.000 people in two days event. 

Notable bands that have performed in Rock In Solo include Death Angel, Kataklysm, Cannibal Corpse, Dying Fetus, Behemoth, Carcass and Nile

After the 2015 edition, the festival experienced a hiatus during 2016-2021, but reactivated in 2022.

Lineups

2004

Held on Friday, May 28, 2004 at Manahan Sport Center, Surakarta

2007

Held on Saturday, August 25, 2007 at Manahan Velodrome, Surakarta

2009

Held on Saturday, October 31, 2009 at Manahan  Sport Center, Surakarta

2010

Held on Friday, September 17, 2010 at Sriwedari Stadium, Surakarta

2011

Held on Saturday, September 17, 2011 at Alun – Alun Utara, Surakarta

2012 

Held on Saturday, October 13, 2012 at Alun – Alun Utara, Surakarta

2013 

Held on Saturday, November 2 & Sunday, November 3, 2013 at Kota Barat Ground, Surakarta. Future president Joko Widodo was in attendance.

2014 

Held on Saturday, October 11, 2014 at Benteng Vastenburg, Surakarta.

2015

Rock In Solo 2015 was held on Monday, November 15, 2015 at Manahan Stadium Parking Park, Surakarta.

2022

The main event of Rock in Solo Festival 2022 was held on October 30, 2022 at Fort Vastenburg, Surakarta. This is the first edition of the festival in 7 years since the last edition in 2015.

Rock in Solo Festival 2022 also featured series of pre-event shows prior to the main event. The pre-event shows called A Journey of Rock in Solo and The Rock Parade took place at multiple venues in Surakarta and its built-up areas from September 18, 2022 to October 26, 2022. A total of 36 bands played for the series of pre-event shows including Metallic Ass, Bandoso, The Working Class Symphony, Wafat, Sisi Selatan, Tendangan Badut, Spirit of Life, Sunday Sad Story and Gendar Pecel.

References

External links
Official website

Heavy metal festivals in Indonesia
Tourist attractions in Surakarta